Wati B is an French record label established in 2000 by Dawala and rap band Intouchable and owned by Sony Music Entertainment. Dawala directs the operations of the label.

Due to the popularity of its signed acts across the French-speaking world, Wati B established its own "Wati B" line of fashion apparel with the first "Wati Boutique" opened on 1 February 2011 in Paris.

Signed artists
The label has signed many acts including the very successful Sexion d'Assaut. It also produced Pur Son Guetto series with two volumes released.

Presently signed artists

Previous signed acts
Jarod
H-magnum
Demon One
Maryam
Esaloss
Le 3e prototype - a subgrouping of Sexion d'Assaut (2005 to 2009) made up of Lefa, Maitre Gims, Barack Adama, Maska and Jeryzoos

Major releases

Singles featured in
2012: "WatiBigAli" (Big Ali featuring Wati B) 
Wati B represented in the single "WatiBigAli" by Black M, Dry and Shin Sekaï's Dadju.

Awards
Sexion d'Assaut has won many awards including:
December 2011: Référendum Planète Rap, "Best Single of 2011" for "Qui t'a dit?"
December 2012: Référendum Planète Rap, "Best Single of 2012" for "Avant qu'elle parte"
December 2012: Référendum Planète Rap, "Best Album of 2012" for " "L'Apogée""
December 2012: Référendum Planète Rap, "Best Duo or Group of 2012"
December 2012: Référendum Planète Rap, "Best Artist of 2012"
January 2013: NRJ Music Awards 2013, "Best Francophone Duo or Group of 2012"
January 2013: NRJ Music Awards 2013, "Best Francophone Song of 2012"

References

External links
Wati B Official website
Wati Boutique website

French record labels
Record labels established in 2000
2016 mergers and acquisitions
Sony Music